Tim Brinkman (born 22 March 1997) is a Dutch footballer who plays for GVVV.

He is the brother of Thierry Brinkman, who is a Dutch field hockey player, and the son of Jacques Brinkman, a former Dutch field hockey player.

Club career
He made his professional debut in the Eerste Divisie for Jong FC Utrecht on 5 August 2016 in a game against NAC Breda.

References

External links
 
 

1997 births
People from De Bilt
Living people
Dutch footballers
Jong FC Utrecht players
FC Utrecht players
SV Spakenburg players
Eerste Divisie players
Tweede Divisie players
Association football midfielders
Footballers from Utrecht (province)
21st-century Dutch people